Marie of Mecklenburg, born sometime between 1363 and 1367, but probably by 1365, dead after 13 May 1402, was a duchess of Pomerania. She was the daughter of Duke Henry III of Mecklenburg (death 1383) and Princess Ingeborg of Denmark (death 1370), elder sister of Queen Margrete I of Denmark.

History 
She married 1380, before March 23, with Duke Wartislaw VII of Pomerania(fallen 1394 or 1395) and together they had one son and a daughter:

 Bogusław (born about 1382, dead 1459), better known as the Kalmar Union King Eric of Pomerania; and, 
 Catherine (born about 1390, dead 1426), married to Count palatine John, Count Palatine of Neumarkt (born about 1383, dead 1443).

Maria was also possibly the heir to her aunt, the Nordic Union Queen Margaret I of Denmark.

See also 
House of Knýtlinga

References 

House of Knýtlinga
14th-century Danish people
1360s births
1402 deaths
Daughters of monarchs